Maksym Ivanovych Mudryi (born 5 May 2003) is a Ukrainian professional footballer who plays as a central midfielder for Ukrainian Premier League club Lviv.

Career

Lviv
He made his professional debut for Lviv in the losing Ukrainian Cup match against Vorskla Poltava on 30 September 2020.

References

External links
 
 

2003 births
Living people
Ukrainian footballers
Association football midfielders
FC Lviv players